Emily Warren is an American physicist who is a staff scientist at the National Renewable Energy Laboratory. Her research considers high efficiency crystalline photovoltaics.

Early life and education 
Warren became interested in science as a child. At elementary school, she campaigned to save the rainforest. Warren was an undergraduate student at Cornell University, where she studied chemical engineering and became aware of the energy industry. She travelled to Nigeria for a course on sustainable development. She was a graduate student at California Institute of Technology. Her research considered the growth of silicon microwire arrays using vapor–liquid–solid methods. These strategies could be used to produce high aspect ratio structures that are efficient in photovoltaics and have a high surface area for use in catalysis and as electrodes in water splitting. After earning her doctorate, she briefly considered working in industry, but instead joined the Colorado School of Mines to work on solar thermoelectric generator projects.

Research and career 
Warren joined the National Renewable Energy Laboratory in 2014, where she started working on electrochemical measurements of semiconductor materials. Her research considers heteroepitaxy of III-V semiconductors. In particular, she is interested in how the nanostructure impacts coalescence and performance. 

Warren has worked on tandem solar cells, multi-layer devices that combine various photovoltaic materials of narrow and wide badgaps to form efficient multi-junction devices. Silicon is used as the bottom cell for many tandem solar cells owing to its high efficiency and well-established fabrication protocols. Warren used computational modelling to demonstrate that a three-terminal device, consisting of a top cell in series with an interdigitated back contact silicon cell with a conductive top contact, was more efficient than a two- or four-terminal device. She showed that it was possible to make highly efficient, highly stable all perovskite tandem solar cells.

Selected publications

References 

Living people
California Institute of Technology alumni
Cornell University alumni
Alumni of the University of Cambridge
American women physicists
21st-century American physicists
Year of birth missing (living people)
21st-century American women scientists